Robert H. Daines III (May 30, 1934 - November 2, 2021) was the Driggs Professor of Strategic Management at Brigham Young University (BYU).

Daines was born in Logan, Utah, the son of Robert H. Daines and his wife, Anna Stoddard Merrill. He was raised in Metuchen, New Jersey; his father was a professor at Rutgers University.

Daines holds an MBA from Stanford University and a Doctorate of Business Administration from Indiana University. He was on the BYU faculty for over 40 years and head of the school's MBA program from 1966 to 1978.

Daines was a member of the Church of Jesus Christ of Latter-day Saints (LDS Church). In the church he served as a bishop, stake president, president of the Pennsylvania Harrisburg Mission (1979-1982), and from 2010 to 2013 as president of the Provo Utah Temple.

Daines is the co-author of the textbook Strategic Financial Management (1988, McGraw-Hill).

Daines married the former Janet Lundgren. Janet was born and raised in Oregon, mainly in LaGrande, Oregon. They were married in the Logan Utah Temple. Among their children is Michelle D. Craig, who became a counselor in the LDS Church's Young Women General Presidency in 2018.

On November 2, 2021, Daines died in Provo, Utah.

Sources
Forbes biography of Daines
BYU speeches bio of Daines

Notes

1934 births
American leaders of the Church of Jesus Christ of Latter-day Saints
Stanford University alumni
Indiana University alumni
Brigham Young University faculty
Mission presidents (LDS Church)
Temple presidents and matrons (LDS Church)
Living people
American Mormon missionaries in the United States
Latter Day Saints from Utah
Latter Day Saints from New Jersey
Latter Day Saints from California
Latter Day Saints from Indiana